The 1956 South American Basketball Championship for Women was the 6th regional tournament for women in South America. It was held in Quito, Ecuador and won by Chile. Seven teams competed.

Final rankings

Results

Each team played the other teams once, for a total of four games played by each team.

External links
FIBA Archive

South
International basketball competitions hosted by Ecuador
1956 in Ecuadorian sport
Sports competitions in Quito
South American Basketball Championship for Women
August 1956 sports events in the United States
20th century in Quito